Luis Xavier Barreto (born 14 October 1980) is an Indian footballer who used to play as a goalkeeper for East Bengal FC in the I-League.

Career

Mumbai (loan)
Singh made his debut for Churchill Brothers S.C. on 19 January 2013 during an I-League match against East Bengal F.C. at the Salt Lake Stadium in Kolkata, West Bengal in which he came on as an 89th-minute substitute for Steven Dias; Churchill Brothers won the match 3–0.

Mohammedan (loan)
After the 2012–13 season ended, Barreto signed with IMG-Reliance to join their Indian Super League but due to objection from the I-League clubs in which they said they would not sign any players who joined the ISL it meant that Barreto would be without a club for a long period of time. Then, on 30 October 2013, it was announced that Mohammedan S.C. had broken that barrier when they signed Barreto on loan.

East Bengal
On 7 June he signed for East Bengal F.C. on a 3-year contract.

Kerala Blasters FC
Luis Barreto played in the inaugural of the Indian Super League for Kerala Blasters FC.

Career statistics

Club

References

Indian footballers
1980 births
Living people
People from South Goa district
Footballers from Goa
I-League players
Dempo SC players
Mumbai FC players
Mohammedan SC (Kolkata) players
East Bengal Club players
Kerala Blasters FC players
Kerala Blasters FC draft picks
Indian Super League players
Association football goalkeepers